Kummi is a folk dance, popular in Tamil Nadu and Kerala in India, danced mostly by Tamil women  in circle. Dancing may be different. In some places, it is very simple, with rhythmic clapping or beating of the drums. In other places dancers imitate various harvesting activities. Kummi often accompany by songs, called "Kummi songs". It is often danced during festivals. It is also danced by Tamils of Sri Lanka. Kummi songs became a popular addition to kuthiyottam festivities in modern times. 

The word "kummi" has originated from the Tamil "kommai", meaning dance with clapping of hands and had originated at a time when instruments were not invented.

One village woman starts a popular song while others join in with singing and clapping to keep note of time. Songs are performed by the women dancing in circles. Men, when they join form the outer circle.

See also
 Padayani
 Theyyam

References

External links
http://india.gov.in/knowindia/kummi.php 
Indian Dances 

Tamil dance styles
Sri Lankan dances
Dances of Kerala